A by-election was held for the New South Wales Legislative Assembly electorate of Auburn on 8 September 8 2001 because of the resignation of Peter Nagle.

Results

				

Peter Nagle resigned.

See also
Electoral results for the district of Auburn
List of New South Wales state by-elections

References

2001 elections in Australia
New South Wales state by-elections
2000s in New South Wales
September 2001 events in Australia